Supervivientes 2015: Perdidos en Honduras, is the tenth season of the show Supervivientes and the fourteenth season of Survivor to air in Spain and it will be broadcast on Telecinco from 16 April 2015 to June, 2015 approximately. For this year the show stay to Honduras for the sixth time. Once again, Jorge Javier Vázquez will be the main host at the central studio in Madrid, with Lara Álvarez co-hosting from the island, and Raquel Sánchez Silva hosting a side debate of the program.

Finishing order

Nominations

External links
http://www.telecinco.es/supervivientes/

Survivor Spain seasons